Clayton Kenny (1928 – 2015)  was a boxer from Ireland, who competed for his native country at the 1952 Summer Olympics in Helsinki, Finland, where he was eliminated in the second round of the Men's Lightweight (–60 kg) division by István Juhász of Hungary. Kenny was born in Ottawa, Ontario and died in Carleton Place, Ontario.

References

1928 births
2015 deaths
Olympic boxers of Canada
Boxers at the 1952 Summer Olympics
Sportspeople from Ottawa
Boxing people from Ontario
Canadian male boxers
Lightweight boxers